Kazuki Murakami may refer to:
 Kazuki Murakami (footballer)
 Kazuki Murakami (diver)